Doctor Solm is a 1955 West German drama film directed by Paul May and starring Hans Söhnker,  Sybil Werden and Antje Weisgerber.

The film's sets were designed by the art director Mathias Matthies and Karl Vollbrecht. It was filmed at the Spandau Studios in Berlin with location shooting around Kitzbühel in Austria.

Cast
 Hans Söhnker as Oberarzt Dr. Karl Solm
 Sybil Werden as Angelika Berding, Tochter
 Antje Weisgerber as Schwester Regine
 Ilse Steppat as Claudia Möllenhauer, Tochter
 Anna Dammann as Elisabeth Berding
 Hans Clarin as Benvenuto Berding, Sohn
 Harald Juhnke as Konrad, Solms Stiefbruder
 Walther Süssenguth as Prof. Berding, Psychiater
 Wolfgang Preiss as Dr. Hartung
 Sepp Rist as Bauer Dinkelsbacher
 Carla Rust as Sophie, seine Frau
 Kurt Vespermann
 Hans Caninenberg as Peter Lauritz
 Karola Ebeling as Evchen, Solms Stiefschwester
 Peter Fischer  as Xaver
 Heinrich Gretler as Dr. Leopold
 Fritz Hinz-Fabricius as Prof. Möllenhauer
 Franziska Kinz as Oberschwester Innocenzia
 Stanislav Ledinek
 Alexa von Porembsky as Schwester Franziska

References

Bibliography
 Bock, Hans-Michael & Bergfelder, Tim. The Concise CineGraph. Encyclopedia of German Cinema. Berghahn Books, 2009.

External links 
 

1955 films
1955 drama films
German drama films
West German films
1950s German-language films
Films directed by Paul May
Medical-themed films
Constantin Film films
Films shot in Austria
Films shot at Spandau Studios
German black-and-white films
1950s German films